Columbus Avenue is one of the major streets of San Francisco that runs diagonally through the North Beach and Chinatown areas of San Francisco, California, from Washington and Montgomery Streets by the Transamerica Pyramid to Beach Street near Fisherman's Wharf. This street is home to several notable venues, such as Jack Kerouac Alley, named for poet Jack Kerouac, City Lights Bookstore, Vesuvio Cafe, Specs' Twelve Adler Museum Cafe (in an alley off Columbus), and Bimbo's 365 Club. 

The street's original name was Montgomery Avenue, and was built in the 1870s. It was renamed Columbus Avenue in 1909.

References 

Streets in San Francisco
Red-light districts in California
North Beach, San Francisco
Chinatown, San Francisco